The Newport Centre is a leisure centre in Newport, South Wales. The Newport Centre is located in Newport city centre on the west bank of the River Usk adjacent to the Kingsway Shopping Centre. It holds events such as concerts, conferences and exhibitions. The centre hosted the Welsh Open snooker tournament from 1992 until 1998, and also from 2005 until 2014, as well as international business conferences and exhibitions. The centre also has suites overlooking the leisure pool and elsewhere; The Riverside Suite, Castle Room, Kingsway Suite, Usk Room, Treetops Suite, and the Emlyn Rooms.

Fitness
The centre has a leisure pool with flume and wave machine. A multi-purpose sports hall has facilities for badminton, netball, tennis, basketball and volleyball. There is a "Solutions" fitness centre and health suite with a sauna, Jacuzzi and sun bed. The centre also has function rooms available for hire and a cafeteria.

Facilities
Multi-purpose entertainment and leisure complex
Health suite & swimming pool
14,530 sq ft (1,530 sq m) exhibition space
TV, video, OHP and screen
Disabled access
1,200 parking spaces nearby

Proposed closure 
In February 2021, after COVID closures, with the facility (particularly the pool area) falling into disrepair ("...plans to reopen the pool safely were found to “involve significant cost”, which is said to be a key factor in keeping the facility closed, and in forming plans to eventually replace it."), a plan by the council has been approved to demolish the centre to make way for educational facilities.

See also
Newport International Sports Village

References

External links
 
 

Newport, Wales
Culture in Newport, Wales
Music venues in Newport, Wales
Tourist attractions in Newport, Wales
Indoor arenas in Newport, Wales
Swimming venues in Newport, Wales
Sports venues in Newport, Wales
Snooker venues
Darts venues
Exhibition and conference centres in Wales